The Ignite Film Festival is a Christian short film festival held annually in Sydney, Australia. The major goal of the festival is to develop young Christian film makers and to encourage people to be creative about communicating the truths of the Bible. Each film is no longer than five minutes and includes the theme for the year.

Ignite Film Festival themes
Each year, Ignite Film Festival has a theme of an item or action being incorporated in the entry films to ensure that they are unique.
 2013 - Joy
 2012 - Hope
 2011 - Life
 2010 - Love
 2009 - Animals
 2008 - Rock or Stone
 2007 - Light
 2006 - Fire
 2005 - H2O
 2004 - Parable

Winners
 2013 - White as Snow - Directed by Leah Beanland
 2012 - Centre - Directed by Michael Snowdon
 2011 - Abide With Me - Directed by Matt Nelson and Damien Madden. Sanctity of Life Category - Dear Mum - Directed by Anthony Vallejos    
 2010 - Remember Me - Directed by David Cairns
 2009 - Enmity - Directed by Matthew Carson-Drever
 2008 - Atarashii Tabidachi
 2007 - A Great Light
 2006 - Arthur
 2005 - Love Thy Neighbour - Directed by James Cogswell & Will Mitchell
 2004 - The Great Feast - Directed by Tim Andrews

External links
 Official Web Site

Film festivals in Sydney
Film festivals established in 2004
Short film festivals in Australia
Christian film festivals